Lars-Johan Peter Eriksson (born 3 August 1958) is a Swedish politician who served as Minister for International Development Cooperation from January 2019 to December 2020. He previously served as Minister for Housing and Digital Development from 2016 to 2019 and was a member of Swedish Parliament (1994-1998 and 2002-2014) and European Parliament 2014-2016. Between 2002 to 2011, he was spokesperson for the Green Party.

Political career

Early beginnings
Eriksson began his political career in Kalix, Norrbotten, where he was Municipal Commissioner from 1999 to 2004. He was also member of the Riksdag 1994–1998 and 2002–2014.

Between 2002 and 2011, Eriksson was one of the two spokespersons (leaders) of the Green Party in Sweden, working alongside Maria Wetterstrand. Under their leadership, the party notably abandoned a demand in its manifesto that calls for Sweden to leave the EU.

Member of the European Parliament, 2014–2016
Eriksson was a Member of the European Parliament from July 2014 to May 2016, where he served on the Committee on Industry, Research and Energy. In addition to his committee assignments, he was part of the Parliament's delegations to the EU-Russia Parliamentary Cooperation Committee, the EU-Moldova Parliamentary Association Committee, and the Euronest Parliamentary Assembly. Within the Greens–European Free Alliance, he served as group's vice-chair under the leadership of co-chairs Ska Keller and Philippe Lamberts.

Return to Sweden
Eriksson served as Minister for Housing and Digital Development from May 2016 to January 2019. In the 2019 cabinet reshuffle, he was appointed Minister for International Development Cooperation. In this capacity, he pledged a total of approximately US$290 million in contributions of Sweden to Global Fund to Fight AIDS, Tuberculosis and Malaria for the 2020-2022 period. On 17 December 2020, Peter Eriksson announced his resignation from the cabinet with immediate effect.

Other activities
 World Bank, Ex-Officio Alternate Member of the Board of Governors (since 2019)

Honours

Foreign honours
 : Knight Grand Cross of the Order of Merit of the Italian Republic (14 January 2019)

References

Peter Eriksson at the Riksdag website

External links
Peter Eriksson, blog

1958 births
Green Party (Sweden) MEPs
Leaders of political parties in Sweden
Living people
Male feminists
Members of the Riksdag 1994–1998
Members of the Riksdag 1998–2002
Members of the Riksdag 2002–2006
Members of the Riksdag 2006–2010
Members of the Riksdag 2010–2014
Members of the Riksdag from the Green Party
MEPs for Sweden 2014–2019
Municipal commissioners of Sweden
People from Tranås Municipality
Sommar (radio program) hosts
Swedish bloggers
Swedish feminists
Swedish Ministers for Housing